Shijiazhuang Gongfu Football Club is a professional Chinese football club based in Shijiazhuang, Hebei. They currently play in Chinese League One.

History
The club was founded as Hebei Jingying Zhihai F.C. in 2020 by the former shareholders of Hebei Aoli Jingying (formerly Hebei Elite) after its acquisition by Beijing Sports University Group and co.

They participated in the Hebei FA Amateur League that year and were crowned as champions after beating Tangshan Haihuang Mingzhu in the final, which earned them the right to play in the 2020 Chinese Champions League, in which they lost to Yichun Jiangxi Tungsten Grand Tiger in the quarter-final play-off, as well as the crucial battle for promotion to China League Two, failing to promote.

In 2021, the club changed its name to Hebei Kungfu F.C., and were admitted into the 2021 China League Two due to the withdrawal of other teams.

In 2022, the club changed its name to Shijiazhuang Gongfu F.C..

Name history
2020 Hebei Jingying Zhihai 河北精英志海
2021 Hebei Kungfu 河北功夫
2022– Shijiazhuang Gongfu 石家庄功夫

Players

Current squad

Managerial history
  Zhang Hui (2021–)

References

External links

Football clubs in China
Association football clubs established in 2020
2020 establishments in China